Biscuit (also referred to as Bizkit or Biskit) is a drinking game played with two dice.

Rules

Each player rolls the dice one time. The first person to roll a 7 becomes "The Biscuit". That player then rolls the dice, with the following results:
1-1 Everyone take a drink
6-6 Roller has to invent a rule which will be applied for the rest of the game. Breaking this rule requires a penalty drink to be taken.
2-2, 3-3, 4-4, 5-5  (doubles) Roller gives drinks to one or several players equal to the number on one of the dice rolled.
1-2 (total of 3) Called a "challenge". Roller chooses a player, that player must roll the dice. Add the result of each dice. The first roller has to make a higher result. If the first roller wins, the chosen player has to drink the difference between the two results. If the first roller failed, he has to drink the difference.
1-6, 2-5, 3-4 (total of 7) All players put a thumb on their forehead and say "Biscuit". Last player to do so drinks and becomes the new "Biscuit".
3-6 4-5 (total of 9) Person to right of roller drinks
4-6 (total of 10) Roller drinks
5-6 (total of 11) Person to left of roller drinks
The number 3 Whenever the number "3" appears on the dice, the "Biscuit" player has to take a drink. (If the dice show 3-3, the player takes two drinks.) Having done so, they cease to be the Biscuit, and the game will have no Biscuit until a 7 is rolled (or another rule nominates a Biscuit).

Having rolled, dice are then passed to the next player clockwise around the table.

References
http://www.buveurs.com/biskit

Drinking games
Dice games